The 2010 season was TOT's 10th season in the top division of Thai football. This article shows statistics of the club's players in the season, and also lists all matches that the club played in the season.

Team kit

Chronological list of events
10 November 2009: The Thai Premier League 2010 season first leg fixtures were announced.
30 June 2010: TOT-CAT were knocked out of the FA Cup by Osotspa Saraburi in the third round.
24 October 2010: TOT-CAT finished in 12th place in the Thai Premier League.

Squad

Current squad

* Players in bold have senior international caps.

2010 Season transfers
In

Out

Results

Thai Premier League

League table

FA Cup

League Cup

First round

1st Leg

2nd Leg

Second round

1st Leg

2nd Leg

Queen's Cup

References

2010
Tot-Cat